Travis Slayden MacGregor (born October 15, 1997) is an American professional baseball pitcher who is a free agent.

Amateur career
MacGregor attended East Lake High School in Tarpon Springs, Florida. As a senior in 2016, he posted a 0.92 ERA with 82 strikeouts over 54 innings. He was selected by the Pittsburgh Pirates in the second round with the 68th overall selection of the 2016 Major League Baseball draft. He signed for $900,000, forgoing his commitment to play college baseball at Clemson University.

Professional career
MacGregor made his professional debut with the Gulf Coast League Pirates, going 1–1 with a 3.13 ERA over  innings. He spent the 2017 season with the Bristol Pirates with whom he started 12 games and went 1–4 with a 7.84 ERA over  innings. He played 2018 with the West Virginia Power and started 15 games, going 1–4 with a 3.25 ERA and 74 strikeouts over  innings. He sat out the 2019 season after undergoing Tommy John surgery, and also did not play in 2020 due to the cancellation of the minor league seson. MacGregor returned to play in 2021 with the Altoona Curve and went 4–9 with a 6.25 ERA over 21 starts, striking out 88 batters over  innings. MacGregor opened the 2022 season with Altoona in their starting rotation but was later moved to the bullpen. In late June, he was promoted to the Indianapolis Indians. Over 38 games (three starts) between the two teams, he went 6-4 with a 5.22 ERA and 103 strikeouts over 81 innings.

On November 10, 2022, MacGregor elected free agency.

References

External links

Minor league baseball players
1997 births
Living people
Baseball pitchers
Baseball players from Florida
People from Tarpon Springs, Florida
Gulf Coast Pirates players
Bristol Pirates players
West Virginia Power players
Altoona Curve players
Indianapolis Indians players